Nancy L. Eiesland (April 6, 1964 – March 10, 2009) was a professor at the Candler School of Theology at Emory University in Atlanta.

Eiesland, born with a congenital bone defect, underwent numerous operations in her youth and experienced considerable pain as well as disability. These factors informed her theological perspective that God is disabled, culminating in her publication of The Disabled God: Toward a Liberatory Theology of Disability (1994). A German translation of this book was published in 2018: Nancy L. Eiesland, Der behinderte Gott. Anstöße zu einer Befreiungstheologie der Behinderung. Übersetzt und eingeleitet von Werner Schüßler, Würzburg: Echter Verlag, 2018, 2nd ed. 2020.

Eiesland died of lung cancer at age 44.

Legacy
In the Fall 2014 Centennial Commemorative Edition of the Candler Connection magazine, Eiesland is posthumously recognized as one of fifty-six Centennial Medalists, and The Disabled God is named among the most significant books written by Candler faculty in its first 100 years.

In 2015, Candler established the Nancy Eiesland Endowment Lecture series. The Dr. Nancy Eiesland Endowment for Disability Studies funded the inaugural lecture on March 25. Dr. Julia Watts Belser delivered the inaugural lecture titled, "Violence, Disability, and the Politics of Healing."

In Spring 2020, the Eiesland Endowment partnered with the Aquinas Center of Theology at Candler to host Miguel J. Romero, whose lecture was titled "Learning to See: Disability, Friendship, and the Christian Life." Unfortunately,this lecture was cancelled as a precaution against the spread of COVID-19.

In November 2020, the Eiesland Lecture was held jointly with the Manfred Hoffmann Lecture. Professors Emeritae Carol A. Newsom and Karen D. Scheib delivered the lecture, "The Resiliency of Job: Finding a Way Through Loss and Grief," and Professor Emeritus Luther E. Smith, Jr. served as moderator for the event.

References

Further reading
 
 
 
 
 
 

Emory University faculty
Deaths from lung cancer
American theologians
1964 births
2009 deaths
American Lutherans
20th-century Lutherans